The 1995–96 Greek Football Cup was the 54th edition of the Greek Football Cup.

Tournament details

Totally 72 teams participated, 18 from Alpha Ethniki, 18 from Beta, and 36 from Gamma. It was held in 6 rounds, included final.

AEK Athens won the cup after 13 years, shattering in the Final 7–1 Apollon Athens, that reached for first and only time a Greek Cup Final. It was also the last title, after 4 championships, that was achieved by AEK Athens, with Dušan Bajević as their coach.

After the Group stage, AEK Athens eliminated in succession Iraklis, Olympiacos, Panathinaikos and Athinaikos, while in a big surprise Apollon Athens qualified in semi-finals against PAOK, with 3–1 in Toumba Stadium. For one more time, AEK Athens and Panathinaikos were drawn as opponents in the groups round, in order to be balloted again confronted in quarter-finals. Demis Nikolaidis played in the Final as footballer of Apollon Athens, a few days before his transfer in AEK Athens.

Calendar

Group stage

The phase was played in a single round-robin format.

Group 1

Group 2

Group 3

Group 4

Group 5

Group 6

Group 7

Group 8

Group 9

Group 10

Group 11

Group 12

Group 13

Group 14

Group 15

Group 16

Knockout phase
Each tie in the knockout phase, apart from the final, was played over two legs, with each team playing one leg at home. The team that scored more goals on aggregate over the two legs advanced to the next round. If the aggregate score was level, the away goals rule was applied, i.e. the team that scored more goals away from home over the two legs advanced. If away goals were also equal, then extra time was played. The away goals rule was again applied after extra time, i.e. if there were goals scored during extra time and the aggregate score was still level, the visiting team advanced by virtue of more away goals scored. If no goals were scored during extra time, the winners were decided by a penalty shoot-out. In the final, which were played as a single match, if the score was level at the end of normal time, extra time was played, followed by a penalty shoot-out if the score was still level.The mechanism of the draws for each round is as follows:
There are no seedings, and teams from the same group can be drawn against each other.

Bracket

Round of 32

|}

Round of 16

|}

Quarter-finals

|}

Semi-finals

Summary

|}

Matches

AEK Athens won 6–0 on aggregate.

Apollon Athens won 4–2 on aggregate.

Final

The 52nd Greek Cup Final was played at the Olympic Stadium.

References

External links
Greek Cup 1995-96 at RSSSF

Greek Football Cup seasons
Greek Cup
Cup